The Moscow City Symphony was established in 2000 by the Moscow City Government. It is resident orchestra at the Moscow International House of Music. The orchestra was directed by Alexander Vedernikov until 2004, then Maxim Fedotov from 2006, and Dmitri Jurowski from 2011.

Discography
 Instrumental masterpieces by J.-S. Bach
 Tchaikovsky. Ballet Suites (1996, Arts Music CMBH)
 Russian Cinema Music (1997, PolyGram Russia)
 Alla Pavlova. Symphony No 1, Symphony No 3 (2003, Naxos)
 Khachaturian, A.I.: Cello Concerto / Concerto-Rhapsody for Cello and Orchestra (Yablonsky, Moscow City Symphony, Fedotov) Naxos 8.570463

References

External links
 Official website

Russian symphony orchestras
Musical groups established in 2000